The following is a list of dog breeds from Tibet:

 Lhasa Apso
 Shih Tzu
 Tibetan kyi apso
 Tibetan Mastiff
 Tibetan Spaniel
 Tibetan Terrier

Dog breeds originating in Tibet
Fauna of Tibet